XO is a US-based private aviation company that provides on-demand private jet travel services. It is a subsidiary of Vista Global with its headquarters in Fort Lauderdale, Florida.

Overview 
In 2018, Thomas Flohr founded Vista Global. In September 2018, Vista bought XOJET Aviation, a 2006 founded charter operator, which is considered the third-largest charter operator in the US. In April 2019, Vista purchased the Florida-based mobile booking app developer JetSmarter.

In June 2019, Vista announced it has merged XOJET with JetSmarter rebranding the combined entity as XO, powered by JetSmarter technology.

References

External links 
 Official website

Airlines of the United States
Airlines established in 2019
Airlines based in Florida
2019 establishments in Florida
American companies established in 2019